The Southend Pier Railway is a  narrow gauge railway in the English city of Southend-on-Sea, Essex. It runs for  along the  length of Southend Pier, providing public passenger transport from the shore to the pier head.

History

19th century

The original pier at Southend was a wooden construction erected in 1830 by a private company. To assist in the loading and unloading of vessels at the seaward end, a  gauge horse-drawn tramway was laid down along its length. When construction of the new pier was sanctioned by the Southend Local Board, the plans included provision for an electric railway. Construction of the line commenced in 1888 concurrently with the building of the new pier, under the direction of C. R. Norton, the former electrical engineer of the pier, electrification being carried out by Colonel R. E. B. Crompton.

This was equipped with a  motor taking current at 200 V DC from the pier's own generator. The compound-wound generator being belt driven from a Davey, Paxman & Co  steam engine with a locomotive-type boiler. Current collection was from a centre rail consisting of a steel channel and copper strip mounted on petticoat insulators, with a carbon brush pickup on the motor cars. The return circuit was through the running rails. In 1890, the  single track was completed and two trailer cars acquired to form a three-car train. By 1893, a passing loop had been completed and a second train of three cars added.

Over the six years from 1893, traffic on the pier had developed to the point where another two trains were needed. At the same time, in 1899, a second generator was provided and the passing loop extended. However, in 1902, Southend Corporation established its own generating station in London Road and the pier plant became redundant and was disposed of. The new supply was at 500 V DC; so the four motor cars were refitted with new motors rated at  each. The trains were made up to four cars each by the purchase of four new trailer cars from the Falcon Works at Loughborough. Two of these were purchased by the Volk's Electric Railway in Brighton when they became redundant in 1949. They were converted into motor cars numbered 8 and 9. These cars continued to operate in Brighton until the late 1990s, when they were again retired. Car 8 was returned to Southend to join the Southend Pier Museum collection, and car 9 is on display at the South Downs Heritage Centre at Hassocks.

20th Century

In 1909 a further four trailer cars were purchased to form four trains of five cars each. The motor cars proved to be underpowered for this load and, in 1910, each motor car was refitted with twin BTH  motors.  In 1911 the conductor rail was replaced with 45lb/yard steel rail, similar to the running rails, with new pickups, made of cast iron, being fitted to the motor cars. 
In 1914, another eight cars were purchased and the trains made up to seven cars each. In 1919, the original track, now twenty years old, needed replacement, so new running and conductor rails were laid throughout the pier.

In 1923, experimental magnetic brakes were fitted to one train set.  The experiment was evidently not a success as they were discarded after about a year. At the same time, new wheels with Bessemer steel tyres were fitted to all the cars.

The year 1928 saw the extension of the midway loop by a further  and new loops were constructed extending from the North (shore) and South (pier head) stations. The following year these loops were joined up to form a double track railway 93 chains, long, along the length of the pier. The track came out of cover at pile 18, the two signal cabins were at piles 47/48 and 179/180, and the south station was at piles 217 to 225.  At some stage, a workshop was built along the west side of the shore station to handle routine
maintenance.

During the Second World War the pier was closed to visitors. It was taken over by the Royal Navy on 9 September 1939, and renamed HMS Leigh, and was used as an assembly point for convoys with anti-aircraft guns on the pier head. It was also the main shipping control point for the Thames Estuary. The trains were used to supply the guns with ammunition and ferry casualties ashore from the ships.  Masters of passing merchant ships used to complain the trains set off the acoustic aircraft early warning devices fitted to their vessels.

By 1949 the original rolling stock was approaching 60 years old and so it was decided to replace it. New stock was ordered from AC Cars of Thames Ditton, the survivors of which worked the line until its closure in the mid-1970s. Twenty-eight cars were supplied, forming four trains of seven cars each, consisting of three motor cars and four trailer cars in M-T-T-M-T-T-M formation, the motors cars being operated in multiple. Each train could carry up to 260 passengers. The record for passengers carried in one day stands at 55,000.

There were three common patterns of operation:
Peak: all four trains in service.  At any time two trains would be moving, one in each direction, while two more were sitting at the stations. As a train was on its way in to a station, the waiting train would depart, so passengers arriving at a station would normally – but not guaranteed – find a train waiting. 
Off-peak: two trains were sitting locked up, while the other two ran a service.  
Low season: one train ran a shuttle service on one track while all the other trains were stored, at one end or the other, on the other track.

By the 1970s there were only two trains left in service, consisting of cars 1–7 and 22–28. One of the surplus motor cars was converted into a works loco, consisting of a driving cab at the south end and a flat bed mounted on the remainder of the chassis. This was used for the transportation of goods out to the bars and stalls at the end of the pier, and also acted as a permanent way train.

In 1978, the electric railway closed, due to deterioration and the cost of repairs. The 1949-built electric cars were withdrawn, although three preserved examples can be found in the Southend Pier Museum. It is noted that in 1982, after rail traffic had ceased, a 2w-2PMR Wickham trolley was present on site, although marked as Out of Use.

The railway was reopened by Princess Anne on 2 May 1986 after rebuilding to  gauge. Two new diesel trains were built by Severn Lamb and introduced on a simplified line comprising a single track with a passing loop and twin-track terminal stations. As originally delivered, the trains were liveried in all-over burgundy with a white waist-band, but were repainted to a two-tone blue in 2006, retaining the white waist-band. They also carried a Southend Borough Council logo.

A battery powered single passenger car, built by Castleline of Nottingham, entered service in November 1995 for service in winter. This car is numbered 1835, the year that Southend Pier first appeared on Admiralty charts. There are also several wagons for maintenance trains.

21st century
On 9 October 2005, a fire severely damaged much of the pier head including the railway station. The station was temporarily re-sited, until a new and modern structure was opened on the original site in September 2009. Although the passenger trains were not damaged, two wagons used on maintenance trains were destroyed in the fire.

In September 2016, the railway was out of action due to emergency engineering works, though the pier itself was still open to the public. The Pier Railway reopened in late 2016. Two new, Severn Lamb built, trains were scheduled to replace the 1986 built trains in 2021. The new trains began arriving at the pier on 28 September 2021. They are painted in the green and cream livery carried by the earlier electric trains.

Operation

The line is owned and operated by Southend-on-Sea City Council, and operates every day the pier is open. The normal service uses a single train, and runs every half-hour. At peak times a two train service is operated, providing a 15-minute interval service. Trains operate between stations known as Shore and Pier Head with no intermediate stops.

The train service is provided by one diesel train and one battery-electric train. The diesel train consists of a diesel-hydraulic locomotive at the southern end, five trailer coaches and, at the northern end, a driver control unit with passenger space and is named Sir William Heygate. A second former diesel train, Sir John Betjeman, has been decommissioned, the locomotive parked at the pier end station, and the carriage bodies removed from their chassis and reused as waiting shelters at various  places in the station and around the pier. The first battery-electric train was named Sir David Amess in tribute to the murdered MP, by Prince Charles and Camilla, Duchess of Cornwall at a ceremony to mark the granting of city status to Southend on 1 May 2022.

A twin-track island platform is provided at each terminus, and there is a passing loop in mid-pier, but otherwise the line is single tracked. The pier head terminus is in the open air, but the shore terminus is enclosed, and also provides rail access to a workshop for maintaining the trains. The Southend Pier Museum is situated below the shore station in the original workshops.

Gallery

See also
Southend Cliff Railway

References

External links 

Pier railway details from Southend-on-Sea Borough Council

3 ft 6 in gauge railways in England
3 ft gauge railways in England
Pier railways
Transport in Southend-on-Sea
Rail transport in Essex
Buildings and structures in Southend-on-Sea